Hesychopa chionora, the white footman, is a moth of the subfamily Arctiinae. It was described by Edward Meyrick in 1886. It is found in the Australian states of Victoria, Queensland and New South Wales.

References

Moths described in 1886
Lithosiini
Moths of Australia